is a former Japanese football player.

Club statistics

References

External links

J. League (#26)

1988 births
Living people
Kochi University alumni
Association football people from Hiroshima Prefecture
Japanese footballers
J2 League players
Japan Football League players
Kataller Toyama players
Kamatamare Sanuki players
Association football midfielders